Yeni Çıktı (New Output) is the first extended play by Turkish singer Simge. It was released on 31 March 2011 by Kaya Müzik.

Release and content 
The EP consists of six songs in total. Producing the songs lasted for one year. Erdem Kınay, Alper Narman and Gökhan Şahin were the EP's composers. It was produced by Doğan Karakaya. Emre Aksu served as the project's supervisor.

Simge herself later talked about the album: "I've lived with the dream of making an album for many years. I slept with this dream, I woke up with this dream. While I present my first album called Yeni Çıktı to all music lovers, I think I have done a successful job in the music industry. As the first step to begin reaching my dreams, I'm in front of you with a new sound."

Track listing

Release history

References

External links 
 Yeni Çıktı - Discogs

2011 EPs
Simge albums
Turkish-language albums